Carnera is a surname.

Carnera may also refer refer to:

 Carnera (comics), an Italian comic book series
 Palasport Primo Carnera, an indoor sporting arena in Udine, Italy